This list of songs about Dubai is a list of songs about Dubai, UAE.

 The Establishment & Sal Davies "Back in Dubai“ (1984)
 "Song for Dubai" by Dubai 2020. Great Expo fun record
 "Arab Money" (2008) by Busta Rhymes on the album, Back on My B.S.
 Mo Mansour ft. Emma Hayes - "Dubai State of Mind" (2011)
 Jasim Feat. Adel Ebrahim - "Emarati - Dubai Expo 2020 Song" (2012)
 Fermel Fuentes, Mazhar Farooqui and Sarat Singh - "Ain’t No City Like Dubai" (2013)
 Virgin Radio & Kris Fade Show - "Dubai Expo 2020 Celebratory Song" (2013)
 DJ flo.ri.an - "This is Dubai" (2014)
 Huncho Jack ft. Offset - "Dubai S**t"
 Tyga -Dubai Drip

References 

Dubai
Dubai in popular culture
Songs about cities